Timothy Q. Purdon is a lawyer who served as the 18th United States Attorney for the District of North Dakota from 2010 to 2015. He is now a partner at Robins Kaplan LLP.

Education 
Born in Oakes, ND in 1968, Purdon moved to Ashby, MN with his family. After graduating from Ashby High School, Purdon graduated from North Dakota State College of Science in 1989 and from Minnesota State University Moorhead summa cum laude in 1991. He received his Juris Doctor from Hamline University School of Law in 1994. Following that, he clerked for Bruce Van Sickle, a judge on the United States District Court for the District of North Dakota.

Career 
Following his clerkship, Purdon practiced law at the firm of Dickson & Purdon in Bismarck, North Dakota. He then practiced law for the Vogel Law Firm, also in Bismarck, from 2005 to 2010. During this time, Minnesota Law & Politics Magazine named Purdon a "Great Plains Super Lawyer" in the practice area of Criminal Defense in 2007 and 2009.

During the 2008 Democratic presidential primary, Purdon served as North Dakota state chairman for the John Edwards campaign.

In 2010, Purdon was nominated by President Barack Obama to be the United States Attorney for the District of North Dakota. He was unanimously confirmed by the United States Senate on August 5, 2010. As U.S. Attorney, Purdon gave special focus to making North Dakota's American Indian reservations safer for their residents and to countering the burgeoning organized crime activity that came with the increased oil activity in western North Dakota during his tenure.

In 2013, Attorney General Eric Holder appointed Purdon the Chair of the Attorney General's Native American Issues Subcommittee (NAIS), which is responsible for recommending policy to address issues that specifically impact American Indian communities. In this role, Purdon also represented the Department of Justice in testimony before the United States Senate Committee on Indian Affairs. In 2014, Holder appointed Purdon to the select Attorney General's Advisory Committee (AGAC), which represents all U.S. Attorneys in advising the Department of Justice on criminal justice policy and department procedures.

On February 10, 2015, Purdon announced he was stepping down from the position of U.S. Attorney, effective March 13, 2015. On his departure from the Justice Department, Attorney General Holder praised his tenure as U.S. Attorney for North Dakota stating that, "Tim Purdon has been an outstanding United States Attorney, a fierce advocate for the people of North Dakota and a strong national leader whose efforts to improve public safety in Indian Country have made a profound difference – and touched countless lives."

Purdon then became a partner at Robins Kaplan LLP, for which he founded and opened a Bismarck office. In the summer of 2015, Purdon and former US Attorney for South Dakota Brendan Johnson founded Robins Kaplan's American Indian Law and Policy Group. Purdon co-chairs this group and the Government and Internal Investigations Group at Robins Kaplan. Purdon continues to practice American Indian Law, and was named Lawyer of the Year in 2021 in Minnesota for his tribal work.

References

External links 
 Timothy Q. Purdon at Robins Kaplan LLP

Living people
Hamline University School of Law alumni
North Dakota lawyers
North Dakota State College of Science alumni
Minnesota State University Moorhead alumni
United States Attorneys for the District of North Dakota
Year of birth missing (living people)
20th-century American lawyers
21st-century American lawyers